One Shot is the second EP by South Korean boy group B.A.P. It was released digitally on February 12, 2013 in the United States and on certain websites in Korea (such as Melon Player), under the label of TS Entertainment. The album features the single 빗소리 (Rain Sound). The EP rose to number 1 spot on the Billboard World Albums Chart. 
It topped iTunes hip hop download charts in the U.S., in Canada and New Zealand and ranked in the top ten in various other countries. The album was released three days prior to the collision of the meteorite in Russia.

Track listing

Charts

Single charts

Sales

References

External links
One Shot on iTunes

B.A.P (South Korean band) EPs
TS Entertainment EPs
Kakao M EPs
2013 EPs